Selway may refer to:

Selway (surname)
Selway National Forest, established in Idaho in 1911 from parts of Clearwater National Forest and Nez Perce National Forest
Selway River, in North Central Idaho in the north-western United States within the Selway-Bitterroot Wilderness

See also
Selway-Bitterroot Wilderness, protected wilderness area in the states of Idaho and Montana, in the United States